The Hotel Claridge was a 16-story building on Times Square in Manhattan, New York City, at the southeast corner of Broadway and 44th Street. Originally known as the Hotel Rector, it was built of brick in the Beaux-arts style in 1910–1911. The 14-story building had 240 guest rooms and 216,000 square feet of space. It operated for 61 years until the building was demolished in 1972 and replaced with 1500 Broadway.

History

The Hotel Rector was established by George Rector as a complement to his popular restaurant, which had been founded by his father and was frequented by New York's rich and famous, including Diamond Jim Brady and Cornelius Vanderbilt III. The timing of his new venture was unfortunate, because as the hotel was being developed, a popular Broadway play was released, called The Girl from Rector's. The play was considered indecent by many critics and gave the Rector's name an unsavory reputation. Rector held the play responsible when he declared his new hotel bankrupt in May 1913. The new owners wanted a new name to escape the stigma, so the Hotel Rector became the Hotel Claridge in 1913. The new name evoked the exclusive Claridge's of London. Although they were no longer using the old name, the new management refused to allow use of the Rector's brand for another restaurant. Rector successfully sued to regain use of his own name.

The American Society of Composers, Authors and Publishers (ASCAP) was founded at the Hotel Claridge on February 13, 1914.

In 1923, the hotel was purchased by real estate investor Benjamin Winter, Sr. for $3 million. In May 1964 it was bought by Douglas Leigh Inc. for an unspecified sum. Leigh indicated he would turn the hotel into a commercial building, with stores, a restaurant and exhibit space on the lower floors and showrooms, offices and meeting rooms on the upper floors.

One of the most enduring images of Times Square is the “Camel Man”, who blew cigarette smoke rings around the clock from 1941 to 1966 from a billboard mounted on the Hotel Claridge.

Demolition and rebuilding
The building was razed in 1972 to make way for a 33-story office tower. National General Corporation based their eastern operations in the building and also incorporated a movie theater into the building, the first new movie theater in Times Square for more than 30 years, which opened December 12, 1972, with the premiere of The Poseidon Adventure. The theater added a screen in 1982 and closed in 1998.

The first and second floors are occupied by ABC's Times Square Studios, home to the Good Morning America television program.

In popular culture
In the film, The Hustler (1961), with Jackie Gleason and Paul Newman, the pool scenes were shot in the Hotel Claridge bar.

In the film Midnight Cowboy (1969), Joe Buck (Jon Voight) lodges in the Hotel Claridge at the beginning of his stay in New York City (but he is soon expelled due to failure to pay).

References

External links

 Images of the Hotel Rector/Hotel Claridge

1911 establishments in New York City
Beaux-Arts architecture in New York City
Broadway (Manhattan)
Buildings and structures demolished in 1972
Defunct hotels in Manhattan
Demolished hotels in New York City
Hotel buildings completed in 1911
Hotels in Manhattan
Times Square buildings